The North Dakota State Bison softball team is part of the athletic program at North Dakota State University in Fargo, North Dakota. They are members of the NCAA Division I and the Summit League. The current Bison softball head coach is Darren Mueller in his 22nd season.  The Bison softball team has appeared in six Women's College World Series, in 1973, 1974, 1975, 1999, 2000 and 2001.

Head coaches

Postseason history
NCAA Division I Championships
2009 Norman Region Champions

NCAA Division I Tournament results
The Bison have appeared in 10 NCAA Tournaments. Their combined record is 10-20.

All seeds denote National Seeds

NCAA Division II Championships:
2000 National Champions

Summit League Championships:
2008 Regular Season Champions
2009 Tournament Champions
2010 Tournament Champions
2011 Tournament Champions
2012 Regular Season & Tournament Champions
2013 Regular Season Champions
2014 Regular Season & Tournament Champions
2015 Regular Season & Tournament Champions
2016 Regular Season & Tournament Champions
2017 Tournament Champions
2018 Regular Season & Tournament Champions
2019 Regular Season & Tournament Champions

North Central Conference  Championships:
1999 Regular Season & Tournament  Champions
2000 Regular Season Champions
2001 Regular Season Champions
2002 Regular Season & Tournament  Champions
2003 Regular Season Champions
2004 Regular Season Champions

Stadium
Tharaldson Park

See also
List of NCAA Division I softball programs

References

External links
Bison Softball website